The Baba Ghodrat Caravansarai is a historical caravanserai related to the Qajar dynasty and is located in Mashhad.

Sources 

Caravanserais in Iran
Architecture in Iran
Buildings and structures in Mashhad
National works of Iran